Byron is an unincorporated community in Osage County, in the U.S. state of Missouri.

History
A post office called Byron was established in 1864, and remained in operation until 1920. The community was named after Lord Byron, according to local history.

References

Unincorporated communities in Osage County, Missouri
Unincorporated communities in Missouri
Jefferson City metropolitan area